John Philip Bourke (5 August 1860 – 13 January 1914) was an Australian poet.

Bourke was born in Nundle, New South Wales, on the Peel River diggings, New South Wales, the son of William David Bourke, butcher, and his wife Jane, née Shepherd. After a primary education, he became a prospector with his father. At 17 years of age, he sold a claim for £600. He then became a school teacher in September 1882 and occasionally contributed verse to The Bulletin. He retired from the education department in 1887 after being found drunk by a school inspector. In 1894 he went to the recently discovered goldfields in Western Australia, prospected in various parts of the west, and at variously made and lost a considerable sums of money. About the turn of the 20th century Bourke took up journalism and was a regular contributor to the Kalgoorlie Sun. He was a writer of vigorous prose and verse which gave him a local reputation, but he was comparatively little known away from the gold-mining towns. He visited the eastern states of Australia for medical advice and to seek a publisher for his books in 1913.
Bourke died at Boulder, Western Australia, on 13 January 1914. A selection from his verse, Off the Bluebush, edited by A. G. Stephens, was published in Sydney in 1915.

'Bluebush' Bourke was a popular poet, one of the leading poets of the goldfields along with E. B. Murphy. In his own phrase they were "singers standing on the outer rim, who touch the fringe of poetry at times". Murphy wrote more and had the larger audience, but Bourke was the more musical and more often did succeed in touching the fringe of poetry. 
Bourke's own estimation of his talent was modest:

We singers standing on the outer rim
Who touched the fringe of poesy at times
With half-formed thoughts, rough-set in halting rhymes,
Through which no airy flights of fancy skim —
We write "just so", an hour to while away,
And turn the well-thumbed stock still o'er and o'er …

References

External links
 

1860 births
1914 deaths
Australian poets